The coat of arms of Vanuatu features a Melanesian warrior holding the spear standing before the mountain superimposed on the boar's tusk encircling two crossed namele fern fronds and the golden scroll on the bottom with the National Motto that reads: LONG GOD YUMI STANAP (In Bislama for, "WITH GOD WE STAND", e.g. "In God we trust"). The Bislama "long" is a preposition derived from the word "along" and has several flexible meanings, "in, on, at," and "with." When used referring to another with personhood, it is generally understood to mean "with (said person)." The original version was designed by Australian artist Rick Frazer in 1980. Since this Vanuatu national symbol does not conform to the rules of heraldry for a traditional coat of arms, then it could be considered a national emblem instead (national emblem of Vanuatu).

Historical emblems

References 
Citations

Bibliography

Vanuatu
National symbols of Vanuatu
Vanuatu
Vanuatu
Vanuatu
Vanuatu